The U.S. National Indoor Championships was a tennis tournament that was last held at the Racquet Club of Memphis in Memphis, Tennessee, United States. The event was played on indoor hard courts and usually took place in February. For much of its more than 100-year history it was a combined men's and women's tournament but in 2014, its final year, only a men's tournament was held. The event was previously known under various sponsored names including the Memphis Open, the Regions Morgan Keegan Championships, the Kroger St. Jude Championship, and the Volvo Championships. It was called throughout most of its history the National Indoor Championships.

History
Newport Center
The tournament began in March 1898 when the inaugural edition was played at the Newton Winter Tennis Club in Newton Center. The only event played was the men's singles which was won by Leo Ware who defeated Holcombe Ward in the final in straight sets. There was no  tournament held in 1899.

New York
In 1900 a men's doubles event was added and the tournament moved to the Seventh Regiment Armory in Manhattan, New York, where it was played on a wood court until 1963 with the exception of 1941 (Coliseum in Oklahoma City) and from 1942 until 1945 when no tournament was held due to World War II. 

Salisbury
When the Seventh Regiment Armory was closed for renovations a new venue for the tournament had to be selected by the USLTA. In 1964 the tournament moved to Salisbury, Maryland, and was organized by Jimmy Connors' manager Bill Riordan. 

Memphis
The last move occurred after the 1976 tournament, when Memphis became the host of the event and was the location of the tournament until its end in 2014. The men's tournament was part of the Grand Prix tennis circuit between 1976 and 1989 before becoming an ATP Tour event.

2014 changes
The 2013 tournament was the last combined men's and women's tournament and was held February 16–24, 2013, at The Racquet Club of Memphis. Marina Erakovic was the last woman to win the title. In 2014 the WTA event moved to Rio de Janeiro. The men's tournament lost its ATP World Tour 500 series certification, which also moved to Rio de Janeiro, but continued an ATP 250 event known as the Memphis Open.

Men's finals

Singles

Doubles

Women's finals

Singles

Doubles

See also
 U.S. Women's Indoor Championships
 U.S. Pro Indoor

References

External links
 Official website

 
Indoor tennis tournaments
Hard court tennis tournaments
Sports in Memphis, Tennessee
St. Jude Children's Research Hospital
Regions Financial Corporation
Tennis in Oklahoma
Tennis in Massachusetts
Tennis tournaments in New York City
Tennis in Maryland
Tennis in Tennessee
1898 establishments in Massachusetts
ATP Tour 500
Defunct tennis tournaments in the United States
2014 disestablishments in Tennessee
Grand Prix tennis circuit
Recurring sporting events established in 1898
Recurring sporting events disestablished in 2014